Bussy Mansel or Bussy Mansell may refer to:
 Bussy Mansell (1623–1699)
 Bussy Mansel, 4th Baron Mansel (died 1750), Welsh peer, MP for Cardiff 1727–34, for Glamorganshire 1737–45